= Harold F. Kells =

Canadian photographer

Harold F. Kells (1904–1986) was a Canadian photographer known for his pictorial landscapes. His works are in the collection of the National Gallery of Canada, and the National Museum of American History.
